Mark Richards (born 9 September 1989) is a South African rugby union player, currently playing with the . His regular position is winger.

Richards also won gold medals as part of the South African Sevens side that won the rugby sevens tournaments at the 2013 World Games and the 2014 Commonwealth Games.

Career

Youth

Richards went to Michaelhouse school in KwaZulu-Natal and earned a call-up to the KwaZulu-Natal Under-18 side that played at the Academy Week competition in 2007.

Richards then joined the Durban-based  academy and played for the  side in the 2008 Under-19 Provincial Championship and for the  side in the 2009 and 2010 Under-21 Provincial Championships.

Sharks

He appeared in all nine of their matches in the competition (starting eight of those), failing to score any points for his side as they reached the Semi-final of the competition.

He finished as the Sharks' second-highest try scorer behind Kobus de Kock and joint-7th overall.

Sevens

At the end of 2010, Richards was included in the South African Sevens team for the 2010 Dubai Sevens leg of the 2010–11 IRB Sevens World Series. He appeared in a further three tournaments during the 2010–11 season and in five tournaments in the 2011–12 IRB Sevens World Series. A chest injury and an Achilles tendon injury ruled him out of the entire 2012–13 IRB Sevens World Series, but he returned to the team for the 2013 World Games in Cali, Colombia, where he helped them win the gold medal match against Argentina, scoring a try and a conversion to secure a 33–24 victory.

Richards played in three tournaments during the 2013–14 IRB Sevens World Series before winning another gold medal with the team, this time at the 2014 Commonwealth Games, where South Africa beat New Zealand 17–12 in the final.

Golden Lions

In 2014, Richards made a return to the 15-man version of the game when he joined the  during the 2014 Currie Cup Premier Division.

Southern Kings

At the end of 2015, Richards was one of a number of players that joined the Southern Kings prior to their return to Super Rugby for the 2016 season. However, the  – the provincial union that was supposed to administer the Super Rugby team – suffered serious financial problems and the South African Rugby Union stepped in to assist the Super Rugby franchise; however, Richards was not one of the players contracted by SARU to represent the Southern Kings. After being unpaid for several months, he was one of eighteen players involved in submitting an application to get Eastern Province Rugby liquidated in an attempt to recoup unpaid salary payments.

Sharks

Richards returned to Durban and was named in the  squad for the 2016 Currie Cup qualification series.

References

South African rugby union players
Living people
1989 births
People from Springs, Gauteng
Rugby union wings
Rugby union fullbacks
Golden Lions players
Sharks (Currie Cup) players
South Africa international rugby sevens players
South African people of British descent
Rugby sevens players at the 2014 Commonwealth Games
Commonwealth Games gold medallists for South Africa
Commonwealth Games rugby sevens players of South Africa
Commonwealth Games medallists in rugby sevens
World Games gold medalists
Competitors at the 2013 World Games
Sportspeople from Gauteng
Alumni of Michaelhouse
Medallists at the 2014 Commonwealth Games